The men's 200 metre backstroke competition of the swimming events at the 1983 Pan American Games took place on 19 August. The last Pan American Games champion was Peter Rocca of US.

This race consisted of four lengths of the pool, all in backstroke.

Results
All times are in minutes and seconds.

Heats

Final 
The final was held on August 19.

References

Swimming at the 1983 Pan American Games